Booking.com, headquartered in Amsterdam, is one of the largest online travel agencies. It is a subsidiary of Booking Holdings. In 2022, the company's mobile app was the most downloaded mobile app in the travel agency category. As of December 31, 2022, Booking.com offered lodging reservation services for approximately 2.7 million properties, including 400,000 hotels, motels, and resorts and 2.3 million homes, apartments in over 220 countries and in over 40 languages. It also offers flights in 54 markets and tours and activities in more than 1,200 cities.

History
In 1996, Geert-Jan Bruinsma, a student at Universiteit Twente, founded Bookings.nl.

In 2000, Booking.com was formed when Bookings.nl, merged with Bookings Online, founded by Sicco and Alec Behrens, Marijn Muyser and Bas Lemmens, which operated as Bookings.org. The name and URL were changed to Booking.com and Stef Noorden was appointed as its CEO.

In July 2005, the company was acquired by Priceline Group (now called Booking Holdings) for $133 million, and was merged with ActiveHotels.com, a European online hotel reservation company, purchased by Priceline Group for $161 million in September 2004.

In 2006, Active Hotels Limited changed its name to Booking.com Limited. The integrations of Booking.com and Active Hotels helped its parent company improve its financial position from a loss of $19 million in 2002 to $1.1 billion in profit in 2011. The acquisition of Booking.com was praised by some social media as “the best acquisition in Internet history” since no other acquisition in the digital travel market had been shown to be as profitable.

Between 2010 and 2012, the company launched mobile apps for the iPad, Android, iPhone,  iPod Touch, Windows 8, and Kindle Fire.

Management history
Darren Huston was appointed chief executive officer of Booking.com in September 2011, and also served as president and chief executive officer of Booking Holdings from 1 January 2014 until his resignation on 28 April 2016 after his extramarital affair with another employee was revealed. Gillian Tans was then appointed CEO. Tans resigned in 2019, after which Glenn Fogel became CEO.

Controversies and criticism

Anti-competitive allegations
In September 2012, the United Kingdom's competition authority, the Office of Fair Trading (OFT), issued a statement of objections against Booking.com, Expedia, and IHG Army Hotels alleging that Booking.com and Expedia had entered into separate arrangements with IHG which restricted the online travel agent's ability to discount the price of room only hotel accommodation. Booking.com, Expedia and IHG proposed the OFT to change their restrictions. The OFT accepted the proposal, but it was later rejected by higher authority at a tribunal.

In April 2015, French, Swedish and Italian competition authorities accepted a proposal by Booking.com to drop its "rate parity" clause and thereby allow competitor travel agents to offer lower hotel prices than Booking.com. Booking.com further agreed to extend and apply its proposal across all EU states. Hotels are still prevented from discounting prices directly on their own websites.

In April 2015, the European Union warned that Booking.com is one of several internet firms that may have reached market dominance beyond the point of no return.

In March 2017, a Turkish court halted activities of Booking.com in Turkey due to a violation of Turkish competition law in a case filed by the Turkish Association of Travel Agents (TÜRSAB). The ruling blocked the website in Turkey; however, website and application can be used from foreign countries to make reservations for hotels in Turkey.

Leaks of customer data
In November 2014, it was revealed that criminals were able to obtain customer details from the website. Booking.com said it was countering the fraudsters and refunding customers from the UK, US, France, Italy, the UAE, and Portugal, all of which had been affected. Since the fraud, Booking.com has made changes so data can only be accessed from a computer linked to the hotel's server. Its teams have also worked to "takedown" dozens of phishing sites, as well as working with some banks to freeze the money mule bank accounts.

The website was again targeted by hackers in June 2018.

On April 6, 2021, the Dutch Data Protection Authority (DPA) imposed a €475,000 fine on the company for failing to report the breach within the time frame mandated by the General Data Protection Regulation. Criminals obtained the personal data of over 4,000 customers including the credit card information of almost 300 people.

Brand hijacking accusations by German hotelier
In February 2015, an open letter published by German hotelier Marco Nussbaum, co-founder and CEO of the "prizeotel" budget-design hotel brand, was highly critical of Booking.com's "brand hijacking" activity in which the company bids significant sums of money to be the top listing on Google Search for several hotel brands.

Charging commissions on prices including VAT
In July 2019, luxury-hotel chain Aldemar, invoking "practices [by Booking.com] that go against the laws of the market," terminated its participation in Booking's offerings. The Greek Hotels Association denounced the practice of Bookings.com of charging its percentage fee on the VAT-inclusive full-room price. The company responded that according to the terms of its bilateral agreements with hotels "everywhere," each party to such an agreement is free to walk away from it.

Inclusion of listing in Israeli settlements

On February 12, 2020, the company was included on a list of companies operating in West Bank settlements involved in activities that "raised particular human rights concerns" published by the United Nations Human Rights Council. The company was categorized under "the provision of services and utilities supporting the maintenance and existence of settlements". The international community considers Israeli settlements built on land occupied by Israel to be in violation of international law.

In September 2022, the company added a warning to its listings in Israeli settlements, although the language was toned down at the request of the Israeli government.

European Commission criticism of manipulative sale techniques
In 2019, following dialogue with the European Commission and national consumer (CPC) authorities, Booking.com committed to ensuring that marketing statements regarding; time-limited offers, the amount of rooms available to book, price comparisons, and the type of vendor offering the accommodation was made clearer to consumers. Changes were also made to make sure that sponsored listings were flagged and that the total price was presented to consumers.

Criticism over request for Dutch aid during COVID-19 pandemic 
In April 2020, Booking.com drew criticism when it applied for government aid from the Dutch government's relief program for business affected by the COVID-19 pandemic, while paying billions to shareholders, with $6.3 billion in cash on its balance sheet. In response, on May 22, Booking announced that it would not seek further wage subsidies from the Dutch government, and instead look for long term answers. The company laid off 25% of its global workforce.

See also
 Patent and Trademark Office v. Booking.com B. V. - In a case that was appealed to the Supreme Court of the United States, the court held that the term "Booking.com", via the suffix ".com" had created an identity that could be differentiated from the generic verb and hence could be trademarked.

References

External links

 

1996 establishments in the Netherlands
2005 mergers and acquisitions
Booking Holdings
Companies based in Amsterdam
Dutch travel websites
Hospitality companies established in 1996
Internet properties established in 1996
Multinational companies headquartered in the Netherlands
Online travel agencies
Travel and holiday companies of the Netherlands